The Promised Land is the 1912 autobiography of Mary Antin. It tells the story of her early life in what is now Belarus and her immigration to the United States in 1894. The book focuses on her attempts to assimilate into the culture of the United States. It received very positive reviews and sold more than 85,000 copies in the three decades after its release. The book's popularity allowed Antin to begin speaking publicly, a platform that she used to promote acceptance of immigration to the United States. It was criticized by anti-immigration activists, who did not see Antin as an American. It was also criticized by some Jews, who felt that she was disrespectful towards her Jewish heritage.

References

External links
 The Promised Land by Mary Antin (1881-1949). Boston & New York: Houghton Mifflin Company, 1912 at A Celebration of Women Writers.

1912 non-fiction books
Jewish American literature
Belarusian-Jewish culture in the United States
Books about immigration to the United States
American autobiographies
Books about the United States written by foreigners